Sven Martinsen (28 September 1900 – 9 September 1968) was a Norwegian sport wrestler.

He was born in Porvoo, Finland, and represented the Sarpsborg club TIL National. He won a gold medal in Greco-Roman wrestling at the 1929 European Wrestling Championships, a silver medal in 1930 and a bronze medal in 1933. He competed at the 1924 and 1928 Summer Olympics.

References

1900 births
1968 deaths
Olympic wrestlers of Norway
Wrestlers at the 1924 Summer Olympics
Wrestlers at the 1928 Summer Olympics
Norwegian male sport wrestlers
20th-century Norwegian people